Manbhum Mahavidyalaya, established in 1986, is the general degree college in Manbazar, Purulia district. It offers undergraduate courses in arts, commerce and sciences. It is affiliated to Sidho Kanho Birsha University.

Departments

Science

Chemistry 
Physics 
Mathematics 
Computer Science

Arts and Commerce

Bengali
English
Sanskrit
Santhali
History
Geography
Political Science
Physical Education
Economics
Commerce

Accreditation
Recently, Manbhum Mahavidyalaya has been re-accredited and awarded B++ grade by the National Assessment and Accreditation Council (NAAC). The college is also recognized by the University Grants Commission (UGC).

See also

References

External links
Manbhum Mahavidyalaya
Sidho Kanho Birsha University
University Grants Commission
National Assessment and Accreditation Council

Colleges affiliated to Sidho Kanho Birsha University
Educational institutions established in 1986
Academic institutions formerly affiliated with the University of Burdwan
Universities and colleges in Purulia district
1986 establishments in West Bengal